Dhairing  is a village development committee in Parbat District in the Dhawalagiri Zone of central Nepal. At the time of the 2011 Nepal census it had a population of 3456 people living in 896 individual households. Temple Bhume Thann is located here.

References

External links
UN map of the municipalities of Parbat District
http://cbs.gov.np/image/data/Population/Ward%20Level/44Parbat_WardLevel.pdf

Populated places in Parbat District